Kosovo-Albanian singer and songwriter Era Istrefi has released 18 singles as a lead artist and four as a featured artist. Since the Albanian singles chart's inauguration in 2015, 4 of Istrefi's singles have reached the top 10 in Albania, with "" and Redrum topping the ranking in 2016 and 2017. She started her career after releasing her debut single, "Mani për money", in 2013. Her breakthrough single, "", followed in 2016, reaching the top 50 in multiple countries, including Australia, Denmark, France, Germany, Romania and Switzerland. It further received certifications, among others gold in Canada, Italy and the Netherlands as well as platinum in France.

Singles

As lead artist

2010s

2020s

As featured artist

Notes

References

External links 

Discographies of Albanian artists